Dorothea is a settlement on the island of Saint Thomas in the United States Virgin Islands. It is located to the northwest of the capital, Charlotte Amalie.

Populated places in Saint Thomas, U.S. Virgin Islands